Saxon Logan (born 8 September 1956) is a British born South African based director.  Logan is known for his documentary and narrative filmmaking and was the winner of an Emmy award for his work on The Lake That Made a Dent.

Personal life 
Saxon grew up in Rhodesia. At the age of 18 he was required to join the Rhodesian Army under conscription laws, however, due to identifying as a conscientious objector he traveled to the United Kingdom in an effort to avoid conscription. He did not study filmmaking. After working odd jobs he found assistance by serving an apprenticeship with director Lindsay Anderson.  He worked at the Royal Court Theatre.  He directed his first play Doctor Galley with Henry Woolf at the Traverse Theatre at the Edinburgh Festival.  This transferred to the Soho Poly in the West End.

Career 
During his apprenticeship with Lindsay Anderson he worked in various departments including locations research, props department, and assistant editor. Following this apprenticeship Lindsay Anderson made him his personal assistant on O Lucky Man!.  He joined BBC TV where he worked as a producer on BBC Art's stand Omnibus amongst others. He made a documentary on Sir Dirk Bogarde and Sculpture, Raymond Mason. Subsequent to his departure from BBC he worked as an independent producer/director and created work for Channel 4 and ITV. 

His documentaries have often centred around environmental and societal issues. Place of The Skulls focussed on the plight of Ivory trade, Black Rhino which focused on the dwindling number of black Rhinos, African Hunter focused on big game hunting. As a result of his documentary work he was made an Honorary Fellow of The Royal Geographical Society.

In addition to documentary filmmaking he has directed several feature films.  He made the super cult film Sleepwalker with Bill Douglas, Nick Grace and Joanna David.  A vocational film maker Logan only makes films that he takes a personal interest in.

Awards 
Logan is known for his documentary filmmaking and was the winner of an Emmy award for his work on The Lake That Made a Dent and was made an Honorary Fellow of The Royal Geographical Society. He also received an honorary mention from the American Academy of Motion Picture Arts and Sciences for his work on Place of Skulls. He received an award at the Berlin Film Festival for his feature film Sleepwalker.. He is currently working on a film series of Doctor David Livingstone's failed Zambezi Expedition, Produced by Lucas Foster.

Filmography

Films

References 

South African film directors
South African documentary filmmakers
Rhodesian people
1956 births
Living people